The Wells Fargo and Company Express Building is a historic commercial building in the ghost town of Silver Reef, Utah, United States, that is listed on the National Register of Historic Places.

Description
The structure was built circa 1877 and is one of three surviving structures in Silver Reef. The building housed the offices of the Wells Fargo Company. The structure was built by local masons George Brooks and Ira McMullin of local red sandstone, with finished ashlar masonry by Brooks in the front and coursed rubble stone by McMullin on the other three sides. A parapet surrounds the single-slope roof on the front and sides. The main level is divided into two equal-sized rooms, each with two front entrances and a rear entrance, with a vault on one side. The basement does not connect to the upper levels. It was used as a stable. The Wells Fargo building was used as a mine supply store in the late 19th century, then for a time as the residence of the Colbath family. Its last use was as offices for the Western Gold and Uranium Company, who added a rear porch structure. The building is owned by Washington County.

The building was placed on the National Register of Historic Places on March 11, 1971. It has been restored and is operated as a museum by Washington County as part of the Wells Fargo Silver Reef Monument.

See also

 National Register of Historic Places listings in Washington County, Utah

References

External links

 Wells Fargo Silver Reef Museum website
 Silver Reef, Utah
 

Commercial buildings on the National Register of Historic Places in Utah
Buildings and structures completed in 1877
Museums in Washington County, Utah
Historic American Buildings Survey in Utah
History museums in Utah
National Register of Historic Places in Washington County, Utah
1877 establishments in Utah Territory